Justin Braun may refer to:

Justin Braun (ice hockey) (born 1987), American professional ice hockey player
Justin Braun (soccer) (born 1987), American professional soccer player
Justin Braun, a founding member of The Negatones